Haim Fabrizio Cipriani (born 1971 in Genoa) is a rabbi and a professional musician.

Biography

Cipriani's rabbinical path is rooted in both Italian and chassidic tradition. He has studied at the Collegio Rabbinico Italiano under the guidance of Rav G. Laras and received the traditional orthodox ordination by the Ateret Tzvi Yeshiva, of Shlomo Carlebach's school, and by the New Yorker Rebbe, Rabbi Joseph H. Gelberman at the Rabbinical Seminary International. From 2006 to 2013, he was Rabbi of congregation Lev Chadash in Milan and Rome. Starting from 2012 he has been the Rabbi of the Conservative/Masorti congregation in Marseille (France) and of the Reform congregation in Toulouse (France).
In 2017 he founded in Italy the congregation Etz Haim, for a Judaism without walls, an associate member of the Masorti/Conservative Jewish movement. 

In 2008, he published the Siddur "Derech Haim", the first progressive Jewish prayer book in Italian, with original translations, study notes and commentaries. He teaches and lectures in Italy and France.

As a violinist, he has worked with the greatest names of the Baroque musique, Jordi Savall, Marc Minkowski, William Christie, Gérard Lesne, and he has been one of the founding members of the Italian ensemble Europa Galante with Fabio Biondi. He has performed concerts as soloist and chamber musician in the most renowned concert halls of the world, and recorded dozens of discs among which many unpublished works of the Baroque period (Mascitti, Dall'Abaco and much more). Conductor of the ensemble Il Falcone, member of Il Giardino Armonico, he is producing a recording of the complete set of the W.A.Mozart sonatas, in duet with S. Ciomei. In 2006, he played in concert with the famous "Il Cannone", the Guarnerius del Gesù which belonged to Niccolò Paganini.

He is professor of baroque violin at the conservatory of Bari, in Italy.

Notes and references

External links
 Official website
 Comunità Etz Haim
 Ensemble Il Falcone
 Giardino Armonico

1971 births
Baroque-violin players
Italian classical violinists
Male classical violinists
Italian Reform rabbis
Jewish classical violinists
Living people
Italian performers of early music
21st-century classical violinists
21st-century Italian male musicians
21st-century Italian rabbis
Musicians from Genoa
Clergy from Genoa